José Gil may refer to:

 José Gil (philosopher) (born 1939), Portuguese philosopher
 José Luis Gil (born 1957), Spanish actor
 José Gil Gordillo (born 1960), Spanish footballer
 José Miguel Gil (born 1971), Spanish diver
 José Gil Solé (1929–2000), Spanish racing cyclist